Colors ~ 30th Anniversary All Time Best is a greatest hits album by Japanese singer Keiko Masuda. Released through Warner Music Japan on November 7, 2012 to coincide with the 30th anniversary of Masuda's solo career, the album compiles her solo works from her Reprise Records, For Life Music, Bourbon Records, Universal Music Japan, and King Records eras. It also includes the new song "Shiroi Kobato", a cover of Eiko Shuri's 1974 hit, plus re-recordings of three Pink Lady-era songs.

The album peaked at No. 298 on Oricon's Weekly Albums chart.

Track listing 
Disc 1

Disc 2

Charts

References

External links
 
 

2012 compilation albums
Keiko Masuda albums
Japanese-language compilation albums
Warner Music Japan compilation albums